Vis Pesaro dal 1898 S.r.l., commonly referred to as simply Vis Pesaro, is an Italian association football club located in Pesaro, Marche.

The club currently plays in Serie C.

History 
Vis Pesaro was founded in 1898 and refounded in 2008.

The club had thirty six participations in Serie C before it was expelled for the 2005-06 season, after which a successor club was restarted at the amateur level.

In the season 2010–11 the club was promoted to Serie D after winning the promotion play-off at the end of the Eccellenza Marche season.

In the season 2017–18 the club was promoted to Serie C after winning the promotion play-off at the end of the Serie D season.

Stadium 
The club plays its home matches at the Stadio Tonino Benelli in Pesaro, which has a capacity of approximately 4,050 spectators.

Colors and badge 
The club colors are white and red.

Players

Current squad
.

Out on loan

References

External links 
 

Football clubs in Italy
Football clubs in the Marche
Sport in Pesaro
Association football clubs established in 1898
Serie C clubs
1898 establishments in Italy